Christina Birkenhake (born 1961) is a German mathematician specializing in algebraic geometry. She is a lecturer at the University of Erlangen–Nuremberg, in the research group on algebra and geometry.

Education and career
After studying mathematics at the University of Münster beginning in 1982,
Birkenhake earned her doctorate (dr. rer. nat.) in 1989 from the University of Erlangen–Nuremberg. Her dissertation was Heisenberg-Gruppen ampler Geradenbündel auf abelschen Varietäten [Heisenberg groups of ample line bundles on abelian varieties], and her doctoral advisor was Herbert Lange.

She worked as a research assistant at the University Erlangen-Nürnberg, earning her habilitation there in 1994, until in 2001 she was given a chair in complex analysis at Johannes Gutenberg University Mainz. She returned to Erlangen–Nuremberg as a lecturer in 2003.

Contributions
With Herbert Lange, Birkenhake is the author of the book Complex Abelian Varieties (Grundlehren der Mathematischen Wissenschaften 302, Springer, 1992; 2nd ed., 2004) and of Complex Tori (Progress in Mathematics 177, Birkhäuser, 1999). She is also a  presenter of public lectures on mathematics.

References

External links
Home page

1961 births
20th-century German mathematicians
Women mathematicians
University of Münster alumni
University of Erlangen-Nuremberg alumni
Academic staff of Johannes Gutenberg University Mainz
Academic staff of the University of Erlangen-Nuremberg
Living people
21st-century German mathematicians